is a Japanese mecha anime creator, animator, director, screenwriter, songwriter and novelist best known for creating the Gundam anime franchise.  He was born in Odawara, Kanagawa Prefecture, and studied at Nihon University's College of Art.

Career
Tomino began his career in 1963 with Osamu Tezuka's company, Mushi Productions, scripting the storyboards and screenplay of one of the first Japanese anime television series, Astro Boy. According to anime producer Seiji Suzuki, while at the company, he was under the mentorship of Hiroshi Wakao, the later founder and first president of production studio Shaft.  He later became one of the most important members of the anime studio Sunrise, going on to direct numerous anime through the 1970s, 1980s and 1990s.  Tomino is perhaps best known for his transformation of the "Super Robot" mecha anime genre into the "Real Robot" genre with 1979's Mobile Suit Gundam, the first in the Gundam franchise. He has also won numerous awards, including the "Best Director" award at the 2006 Tokyo International Anime Fair (for the 2005 film Mobile Suit Zeta Gundam: Heirs to the Stars).  Two anime series directed by Tomino (Mobile Suit Gundam in 1979–
80 and Space Runaway Ideon in 1980) won the Animage Anime Grand Prix award.

Tomino has collaborated (as Iogi) with artists such as Yoko Kanno, Asei Kobayashi, MIO and Neil Sedaka.

Tomino is noted for directing several well-known anime series throughout his career, such as his most notable work, the Mobile Suit Gundam series, beginning in 1979, and which was later followed onto numerous sequels, spinoffs and merchandising franchises, Aura Battler Dunbine, Brave Raideen (in which he directed the first 26 episodes), and numerous others.  His newer work includes Brain Powerd (1998), Turn A Gundam (1999), Overman King Gainer (2002) and most recently, Gundam Reconguista in G (2014).

1970s
Tomino made his directorial debut with 1972's .  This show, loosely based on Osamu Tezuka's manga Blue Triton, showed a different perspective than the traditional "good vs. evil" show.  The star, Triton, a 10-year-old boy, is the last survivor of the Tritons, a tribe from Atlantis that was wiped out by the supposedly evil Poseidons.  However the viewers learn later on that the story was not so black and white after all.

In 1975, Tomino worked on Brave Raideen, his first mecha work, in which he directed the first 26 episodes. Raideen was renowned and influential in its innovative portrayal of a giant machine of mysterious and mystical origins, and has gone on to inspire numerous other directors and series, including Yutaka Izubuchi's 2002 series, RahXephon.  Tomino also later worked on 1977's Voltes V.

In 1977, Tomino directed Zambot 3. Certain sources cite this series as the origin of a nickname used by some anime fans, due to the high number of character deaths (although Tomino had directed and worked in a number of series in which the vast majority of the protagonists survive).

In 1978, Tomino conceived, wrote and directed the successful Super Robot series Daitarn 3, which featured an unusual mix of spy adventure, drama, sci-fi and irony. The series introduced many "pastiche" elements which became popular in the Eighties. The lead character, Haran Banjo, is considered one of the most multi-layered and fascinating anime characters in history.

In 1979, Tomino directed and wrote Mobile Suit Gundam, which was highly influential in transforming the Super Robot mecha genre into the Real Robot genre.  Mark Simmons discusses the impact of Gundam in his book, "Gundam Official Guide":

In an interview published in Animerica magazine, Tomino discusses what he was trying to accomplish with Mobile Suit Gundam:

Although the last quarter of the show's original script was canceled and it had to be completed in 43 episodes, its popularity grew after three compilation movies were released in 1981 and 1982. Mobile Suit Gundam was followed by numerous sequels, spin-offs and merchandising franchises, becoming one of the longest-running and most influential, popular anime series in history, being chosen as No. 1 on TV Asahi's "Top 100 Anime" listing in 2005.

1980s
In 1980, Tomino directed Space Runaway Ideon, a series which like Mobile Suit Gundam was cancelled on its initial run, but featured movie versions later on. The series is known for its darker story elements. Tomino followed up with a more light-hearted series called Xabungle, but the darker nature of Ideon continued with 1983's Aura Battler Dunbine.

In 1984, Tomino released Heavy Metal L-Gaim. The following year, Tomino directed the first sequel to 1979's Mobile Suit Gundam, Mobile Suit Zeta Gundam. Tomino's involvement in the following Gundam series, 1986's Mobile Suit Gundam ZZ created an upbeat, comedic theme whereas the earlier Gundam's are of a darker theme. In 1988, Tomino concluded the saga begun in Mobile Suit Gundam with the Gundam motion picture Char's Counterattack.

1990s and 2000s

Tomino directed an additional Gundam motion picture, Mobile Suit Gundam F91 in 1991.  This movie, which took place 30 years after Char's Counterattack, re-launched the Gundam saga in a new direction by featuring a completely new cast.

In 1993, Tomino directed his next Gundam series, Victory Gundam, which (like F91 before) attempted to relaunch the Gundam saga with a completely new cast.

In 1996, Tomino wrote and directed Garzey's Wing, and in 1998 wrote and directed Brain Powerd.  In 1999, he returned to Gundam with Turn A Gundam and in 2002, directed two compilations movies for it entitled Turn A Gundam I: Earth Light and Turn A Gundam II: Moonlight Butterfly.  Also in 2002, he directed Overman King Gainer, and in 2005, Tomino directed 3 compilation movies summarizing the events of 1985's Zeta Gundam.  His last major original work in the 2000s was the 6-episode OVA The Wings of Rean, which first premiered on the Internet across Bandai Channel, the broadcast beginning from December 12, 2005, with the final episode starting on August 18, 2006.  Also in 2006, Tomino made a special cameo appearance in Shinji Higuchi's tokusatsu film Japan Sinks.

At the 2009 CESA Developers Conference, Tomino used his keynote speech to criticize the gaming industry, citing that video games "bringing no productivity at all" and that "consoles are just consuming electricity", while stressing that game developers need to focus more on quality content rather than advanced technology, comparing it to the modern animation industry. His surprising remarks have sparked mass discussions online.

After working on the CGI short Ring of Gundam for Gundam's 30th anniversary in 2009, Tomino returned to the franchise again for its 35th anniversary in 2014 in a new work in which he wrote and directed, Gundam Reconguista in G.

Tomino was present at Gundam Factory Yokohama for the opening ceremony of the 18-meter "life-size" moving statue of Gundam in Yokohama.

Filmography
 Astro Boy (1963 - Writer, Storyboards)
 Wandering Sun (1971 - Storyboards)
 Triton of the Sea (1972 - Director)
 Neo-Human Casshern (1973 - Storyboards)
 La Seine no Hoshi (1975 - Director, episodes 27–39)
 The Adventures of Pepero (1975-1976 - Production Director, episodes 20, 23 and 25)
 Brave Raideen (1975 - Director (first 26 episodes))
 Super Electromagnetic Machine Voltes V (1977 - Producer)
 Invincible Super Man Zambot 3 (1977 - Writer, Director)
 Invincible Steel Man Daitarn 3 (1978 - Writer, Director)
 Mobile Suit Gundam (1979-1980 - Writer, Director)
 Space Runaway Ideon (1980 - Writer, Director)
 Mobile Suit Gundam: The Movie (1981 - Writer, Director)
 Mobile Suit Gundam II: Soldiers of Sorrow (1982 - Writer, Director)
 Mobile Suit Gundam III: Encounters in Space (1982 - Writer, Director)
 The Ideon: A Contact (1982 - Writer, Director)
 The Ideon: Be Invoked (1982 - Writer, Director)
 Combat Mecha Xabungle (1982 - Writer, Director)
 Aura Battler Dunbine (1983 - Writer, Director)
 Xabungle Graffiti (1983 - Writer, Director)
 Round Vernian Vifam (1983 - Planning)
 Heavy Metal L-Gaim (1984 - Director)
 Mobile Suit Zeta Gundam (1985-1986 - Writer, Director)
 Mobile Suit Gundam ZZ (1986-1987 - Writer, Director)
 Mobile Suit Gundam: Char's Counterattack (1988 - Writer, Director)
 Mobile Suit Gundam F91 (1991 - Writer, Director)
 Mobile Suit Victory Gundam (1993 - Writer, Director)
 Garzey's Wing (1996 - Writer, Director)
 Brain Powerd (1998 - Writer, Director)
 Turn A Gundam (1999-2000 - Writer, Director)
 Turn A Gundam I: Earth Light (2002 - Writer, Director)
 Turn A Gundam II: Moonlight Butterfly (2002 - Writer, Director)
 Overman King Gainer (2002 - Director)
 The Wings of Rean (2005 - Writer, Director)
 Mobile Suit Zeta Gundam: A New Translation I - Heirs To The Stars (2005 - Writer, Director)
 Mobile Suit Zeta Gundam: A New Translation II - Lovers (2005 - Writer, Director)
 Mobile Suit Zeta Gundam: A New Translation III - Love is the Pulse of the Stars (2006 - Writer, Director)
 Japan Sinks (2006 - Actor)
 Ring of Gundam (2009 - Writer, Director)
 Gundam Reconguista in G (2014 - Writer, Director)

Discography (as Rin Iogi)
Mobile Suit Gundam
"Tobe! Gandamu (Fly! Gundam)" by Koh Ikeda (Series Opening Theme)
"Eien ni Amuro (Forever Amuro)" by Koh Ikeda (Series Ending Theme)
"Char ga Kuru (Char is Coming)" by Koichiro Hori
"Kirameki no Lalah (Shining Lalah)" by Keiko Toda
"Ima wa O-Yasumi" by Keiko Toda
"Kaze ni Hitori de (Alone in the Wind)" by Inoue Daisuke (Movie 2 Insert Song)
"Ai Senshi (Soldiers of Sorrow)" by Inoue Daisuke (Movie 2 Ending Theme)
"Beginning" by Inoue Daisuke (Movie 3 Insert Song)
"Meguriai (Encounters)" by Inoue Daisuke (Co-written with Maso Urino) (Movie 3 Ending Theme)

Aura Battler Dunbine
"Dunbine Tobu (Flying Dunbine, English version titled Dunbine Fire translated by J.C.Edward)" by MIO (Opening Theme)

Heavy Metal L-Gaim
"Time for L-Gaim" by MIO (Opening Theme)

Mobile Suit Zeta Gundam
"Zeta - Toki wo Koete (Zeta - Transcending Times)" by Maya Arukawa, composed by Neil Sedaka as Better Days Are Coming (First Opening Theme)

Mobile Suit Gundam ZZ
"Issenman-Nen Ginga (The 10-million-year-old Galaxy)" by Jun Hiroe (Second Ending Theme)

Mobile Suit Gundam F91
"Eternal Wind" by Hiroko Moriguchi (Ending Song)

Mobile Suit Victory Gundam
"Stand up to the Victory" (First Opening Theme)

Brain Powerd, composed by Yoko Kanno
"Ai no Field" by Kokia (First Ending Theme)

Turn A Gundam, composed by Yoko Kanno
"Turn A Turn" by Hideki Saijou, composed by Asei Kobayashi (First Opening Theme)
"Century Color" by RAYS-GUNS (Co-written with You-mu Hamaguchi) (Second Opening Theme)
"Ojousan Naishobanashi desu (This is a private conversation, miss)" by Hideki Saijou
"Tsuki no Tama (Spirit of the Moon)" by RRET Team
"Tsuki no Mayu (The Cocoon of the Moon)" by Aki Okui (Second Ending Theme)

Overman King Gainer
"King Gainer Over!" by Yoshiki Fukuyama (Opening Theme)

Gundam Reconguista in G
"G no Senkō" by Daisuke Hasegawa (Ending Theme)

Honours
Person of Cultural Merit (2021)

References

External links
Nippon Battling Society, in which Tomino is in charge 
Animefood Magazine Yoshiyuki Tomino Interview
Entry in The Encyclopedia of Science Fiction

1941 births
Anime directors
Anime screenwriters
Living people
Japanese animated film directors
Japanese animated film producers
Japanese animators
Japanese film directors
Japanese musicians
Musicians from Kanagawa Prefecture
Nihon University alumni
Persons of Cultural Merit
People from Odawara
Sunrise (company) people